Riley Holzapfel (born August 18, 1988) is a Canadian professional ice hockey player, currently contracted by the Vienna Capitals in the Austrian Hockey League (EBEL).

Playing career
Holzapfel played major junior hockey for the Moose Jaw Warriors of the Western Hockey League (WHL). He was drafted by the Atlanta Thrashers at the 2006 NHL Entry Draft, chosen 43rd overall. On September 6, 2007, Riley signed a three-year entry level contract with the Thrashers. In 2008, he played for Canada in the IIHF World U20 Championship where Canada went on to win gold in a 3-2 victory over Sweden.

On February 13, 2012, Holzapfel was traded by the Winnipeg Jets to the Anaheim Ducks in exchange for Maxime Macenauer. He was then immediately assigned to Ducks AHL affiliate, the Syracuse Crunch.

He signed a one-year, two-way contract as a free agent with the Pittsburgh Penguins on July 1, 2012, but spent the season in AHL with Wilkes-Barre/Scranton Penguins. In July 2013, he signed a two-year deal with the Swedish Hockey League club HV71.

After a further third season in Sweden with newly promoted Karlskrona HK in 2015–16 season, Holzapfel left as a free agent to sign a one-year deal with Austrian club, the Vienna Capitals of the EBEL on July 20, 2016. After leading the Capitals with 53 points in 54 games in the 2016–17 season, and contributing with 23 points in just 12 post-season games, he received the Ron Kennedy Trophy as the league's Most Valuable Player.

Career statistics

Regular season and playoffs

International

Awards and honours

References

External links

1988 births
Atlanta Thrashers draft picks
Canadian ice hockey centres
Chicago Wolves players
HV71 players
Ice hockey people from Saskatchewan
Karlskrona HK players
Living people
Moose Jaw Warriors players
Sportspeople from Regina, Saskatchewan
St. John's IceCaps players
Syracuse Crunch players
Vienna Capitals players
Wilkes-Barre/Scranton Penguins players
Canadian expatriate ice hockey players in Austria
Canadian expatriate ice hockey players in Sweden